Pope Innocent VII (1339 – 6 November 1406), born Cosimo de' Migliorati, was head of the Catholic Church from 17 October 1404 to his death in November 1406. He was pope during the period of the Western Schism (1378–1417), and was opposed by the Avignon claimant Benedict XIII. Despite good intentions, he did little to end the schism, owing to the troubled state of affairs in Rome, and his distrust of the sincerity of Benedict XIII, and King Ladislaus of Naples.

Early life
Cosimo de' Migliorati was born to a simple family of Sulmona in the Abruzzi. He distinguished himself by his learning in both civil and Canon Law, which he taught for a time at Perugia and Padua. His teacher Giovanni da Legnano sponsored him at Rome, where Pope Urban VI (1378–89) took him into the Curia, sent him for ten years as papal collector to England, made him Bishop of Bologna in 1386 at a time of strife in that city, and Archbishop of Ravenna in 1387.

Pope Boniface IX made him cardinal-priest of S. Croce in Gerusalemme (1389) and sent him as legate to Lombardy and Tuscany in 1390. When Boniface IX died, there were present in Rome delegates from the rival pope at Avignon, Benedict XIII. The Roman cardinals asked these delegates whether their master would abdicate if the cardinals refrained from holding an election. When they were bluntly told that Benedict XIII would never abdicate (indeed he never did), the cardinals proceeded to an election. First, however, they each undertook a solemn oath to leave nothing undone, and, if need be, lay down the tiara to end the schism.

Papacy

Migliorati was unanimously chosen – by eight cardinals – on 17 October 1404 and took the name of Innocent VII. There was a general riot by the Ghibelline party in Rome when news of his election got out, but peace was maintained by the aid of King Ladislaus of Naples, who hastened to Rome with a band of soldiers to assist the Pope in suppressing the insurrection. For his services the king extorted various concessions from Innocent VII, among them the promise that Ladislaus' claim to Naples would not be compromised, which claim had been challenged until very recently by Louis II of Anjou. That suited Innocent VII, who had no intention of reaching an agreement with Avignon that would compromise his claims to the Papal States. Thus Innocent VII was laid under embarrassing obligations, from which he freed himself.

Innocent VII had made the great mistake of elevating his highly unsuitable nephew Ludovico Migliorati – a colorful condottiero formerly in the pay of Giangaleazzo Visconti of Milan – to be Captain of the Papal Militia, an act of nepotism that cost him dearly. Innocent further named him the rector of Todi in April 1405. In August 1405, Ludovico Migliorati, using his power as head of the militia, seized eleven members of the obstreperous Roman partisans on their return from a conference with the Pope, had them murdered in his own house, and had their bodies thrown from the windows of the hospital of Santo Spirito into the street. There was an uproar. Pope, court and cardinals, with the Migliorati faction, fled towards Viterbo. Ludovico took the occasion of driving off cattle that were grazing outside the walls, and the Papal party were pursued by furious Romans, losing thirty members, whose bodies were abandoned in the flight, including the Abbot of Perugia, struck down under the eyes of the Pope.

Innocent's protector Ladislaus sent a squad of troops to quell the riots, and by January 1406 the Romans again acknowledged Papal temporal authority, and Innocent VII felt able to return. But Ladislaus, not content with the former concessions, desired to extend his authority in Rome and the Papal States. To attain his end he aided the Ghibelline faction in Rome in their revolutionary attempts in 1405. A squad of troops which King Ladislaus had sent to the aid of the Colonna faction was still occupying the Castle of Sant' Angelo, ostensibly protecting the Vatican, but making frequent sorties upon Rome and the neighbouring territory. Only after Ladislaus was excommunicated did he yield to the demands of the Pope and withdraw his troops.

Shortly after his accession in 1404 Innocent VII had taken steps to keep his oath by proclaiming a council to resolve the Western Schism. King Charles VI of France, theologians at the University of Paris, such as Pierre d'Ailly and Jean Gerson, and King Rupert of Germany, were all urging such a meeting. However, the troubles of 1405 furnished him with a pretext for postponing the meeting, claiming that he could not guarantee safe passage to his rival Benedict XIII if he came to the council in Rome. Benedict, however, made it appear that the only obstacle to the end of the Schism was the unwillingness of Innocent VII. Innocent VII was unreceptive to the proposal that he as well as Benedict XIII should resign in the interests of peace.

Death
Innocent died in Rome on 6 November 1406. It is said that Innocent VII planned the restoration of the Roman University, but his death brought an end to such talk.

See also

List of popes

References

Sources

External links

 

Popes
Italian popes
University of Perugia alumni
14th-century Italian Roman Catholic archbishops
Archbishops of Ravenna
People from Sulmona
1339 births
1406 deaths
Cardinal-nephews
15th-century popes
Burials at St. Peter's Basilica